Sherri Ann Jarvis (March 9, 1966 – November 1, 1980) was an American murder victim from Forest Lake, Minnesota whose body was discovered in Huntsville, Texas on November 1, 1980. Her body was discovered within hours of her sexual assault and murder, and remained unidentified for 41 years before investigators announced her identification via forensic genealogy in November 2021.

Despite initial efforts to discover both her identity and that of her murderer(s), the investigation into Jarvis's murder gradually became a cold case. Numerous efforts were made to determine her identity, including several forensic facial reconstructions of how she may have appeared in life. The investigation into her murder is ongoing.

Prior to her identification, Jarvis was known as the Walker County Jane Doe in reference to the county in which her body was discovered and where she was later buried in a donated casket.

Discovery
On November 1, 1980, the nude body of a girl estimated to be between the ages of 14 and 18 was discovered by a truck driver who had been driving past the Sam Houston National Forest. This motorist called police at 9:20 a.m. to report his discovery.

The victim had been deceased for approximately six hours, thus placing her time of death around 3:20 a.m. A rectangular brown pendant containing a smoky blue or brown glass colored stone on a thin gold chain necklace was found around her neck. Her ears were pierced, although no earrings were found in her ears nor at the crime scene. High-heeled red leather sandals with light brown straps, which investigators would subsequently discover the girl had been seen carrying while alive, were also recovered from the scene, although the remainder of her clothing was missing.

Autopsy
Her eyes were hazel, and her hair was approximately 10 inches in length and light brown in color, with what has been described as a possible reddish tint, although her hair bore no evidence of having received color treatment. The decedent's fingernails were bare, and her toenails had been painted pink. Distinctive features upon her body were a vertical scar measuring one-and-a-half inches at the edge of her right eyebrow and the fact that her right nipple was inverted. Due to the general condition of the decedent's body, including her overall health, nutrition and the excellent dental care she had received in life, she was believed to have hailed from a middle-class household.

The cause of death was certified by the coroner to be asphyxia due to ligature strangulation, possibly inflicted via a pantyhose, fragments of which—along with the decedent's underwear—were found inside the victim's vaginal cavity. The pantyhose and underwear had likely been placed inside the girl's vaginal cavity in an attempt to prevent her body from bleeding as she was transported to the site of her discovery as the girl had been sexually assaulted with a large blunt instrument both vaginally and anally, and these acts had occurred prior to her death. It is unknown if the girl had actually been conventionally raped, as no biological evidence attesting to this form of assault was discovered either at the crime scene or in the subsequent coroner's examination of her body. Furthermore, the girl had also been the recipient of a severe beating which had been inflicted prior to her death as many bruises were evident across her body, with her lips and right eyelid, in particular, being extensively swollen. In addition, the right shoulder of the decedent's body bore a deep and visible bite mark.

Investigation

Sightings
Following exhaustive witness appeals and extensive media accounts regarding this murder, numerous individuals (all of whom are now deceased) informed investigators they had seen a teenage girl matching the decedent's description within the 24 hours prior to her murder. These individuals include the manager of a South End Gulf station and two employees at the Hitch 'n' Post truck stop, all of whom described this girl as wearing blue jeans, a dirty yellow pullover, and a white knit sweater with noticeably large pockets which extended past her waist. This girl had been carrying red leather-strapped high heel sandals.

According to the first witness, the girl—appearing somewhat disheveled—had arrived at the South End Gulf station at approximately 6:30 p.m. on October 31. At this location, she had exited a blue 1973 or 1974 model Chevrolet Caprice with a light-colored top, which had been driven by a white male. This witness stated the girl had asked for directions to the Texas Department of Corrections Ellis Prison Farm. After receiving directions, the girl had left the Gulf station on foot, and was later seen walking north on Sam Houston Avenue.

This same girl was later seen at the Hitch 'n' Post truck stop alongside Interstate 45, where she again requested directions to the Texas Department of Corrections Ellis Prison Farm, claiming "a friend" was waiting for her at this location. In response, a waitress drew a map providing directions to the prison farm which she then handed to the girl. This waitress informed investigators that she had suspected the girl was a runaway and that in their brief conversation, the girl had informed her she was from either Rockport or Aransas Pass, Texas. The girl had also claimed to this waitress that she was 19 years old; when the waitress had expressed doubts as to her claimed age and further asked if her parents knew her whereabouts, this girl had reportedly replied, "Who cares?"

Ellis Prison Farm
Both inmates and employees of the Ellis Prison Farm were canvassed and shown mortuary photographs of the victim, although none were able to identify her. According to one detective, only one inmate was of a similar age to the victim, although investigators were never able to establish a connection between the two. Investigators also traveled to both the Rockport and Aransas Pass districts to converse with law enforcement personnel regarding any missing females whose physical description matched that of the victim. Staff at schools in both districts were also contacted by investigators for the same purpose, and numerous Texas high school books were searched for any female known to be missing whose physical features matched her description. All these lines of inquiry failed to bear fruit, and no missing person reports relating to young Caucasian females were ever matched to the victim at the time.

Despite the fact police and media appeals in the towns of Rockport or Aransas Pass to discover the identity of the victim failed to produce any fruitful leads as to her identity, it was thought that she may have indeed hailed from the general region she had stated to the waitress at the Hitch 'n' Post truck stop the evening prior to her murder.

Funeral
On January 16, 1981, the unidentified girl was buried in the Adickes Addition at Oakwood Cemetery. Her burial followed an open-casket funeral, and the cemetery in which she was interred is located within the city where her body was found. She is buried beneath a tombstone donated by Morris Memorials; the inscription upon her tombstone reads, "Unknown white female. Died Nov. 1, 1980." A new tombstone bearing her name, nickname, photograph, and the inscription "Never alone and loved by many" has since been erected.

Ongoing investigation

Further forensic analysis
The remains of Walker County Jane Doe were exhumed in 1999 in order to conduct a further forensic examination of her remains, including the obtaining of a DNA sample from her body. This second forensic examination of her body revised the likely age of Walker County Jane Doe to be between 14 and 18 years old,  with investigators stating they believed the most likely age of Walker County Jane Doe to be between 14-and-a-half and 16-and-a-half years old.

In November 2015, the case was officially reopened by the Walker County Sheriff's Office.

DNA testing was also conducted upon the high-heeled red leather sandals found at the crime scene; the results of this testing remain undisclosed. Local police departments also actively monitored other missing person reports for any potential matches to the victim. Investigators have also reached out to the public via various online websites, news media and television networks in hopes of generating further leads of inquiry—all of which, to date, have been unsuccessful in identifying her murderer(s).

Facial reconstructions
Several forensic facial reconstructions have been created to illustrate estimations of how Walker County Jane Doe may have looked in life. In 1990, forensic and portrait artist Karen T. Taylor created a postmortem drawing of Walker County Jane Doe in which she incorporated an estimation as to the appearance of the necklace she had been wearing. An investigator at the Walker County Sheriff's office has also created a facial rendering of the victim.

Taylor has included this case in her book Forensic Art and Illustration, in which she confessed to having experienced difficulties in creating her sketch of the decedent as the only frontal photograph made available to her at the time was of one taken after the victim had received extensive reconstructive cosmetic treatment at the Huntsville Funeral Home in order for her facial features to be sufficient to be viewed in an open-casket funeral. Taylor further explained that a scaled photograph of the girl's necklace was not made available to her, and she was forced to guess at the size of this item of jewelry for the facial reconstruction she produced.

Within the decade prior to Walker County Jane Doe's identification, the National Center for Missing & Exploited Children constructed and released two facial reconstructions of how the victim may have appeared in life. The first facial reconstruction was released in 2012 and the second shortly after the 35th anniversary of her murder. All facial reconstructions were created with the aid of studying mortuary photographs taken of the victim.

Identification
In 2020, the Walker County Sheriff's Office partnered with Othram Incorporated to attempt to identify Walker County Jane Doe via genetic genealogy. Initial attempts to extract usable genetic materials from her remains were unsuccessful, but testing on her preserved tissue samples yielded usable DNA, which was used to generate a genetic profile of the victim and construct a family tree. Through this family tree, living relatives of the victim were identified and located. DNA swabs from these individuals were used to confirm the identity of Walker County Jane Doe in 2021.  

On November 9, 2021, the Walker County Sheriff's Office publicly announced the identity of Walker County Jane Doe as 14-year old Sherri Ann Jarvis, who had run away from  Stillwater, Minnesota in 1980. Her identification had previously been announced in late September 2021 by forensic artist Carl Koppelman, who had produced several forensic reconstructions of the victim, and who announced that her identity was temporarily being withheld to give her family sufficient time to grieve privately.

Jarvis was known as "Tati" to her friends; she had been removed from her home and placed under the state's custody at age 13 due to her habitual truancy and had run away shortly after her 14th birthday. Her final contact with her family had been a letter penned to her mother from Denver in August 1980. In this letter, Jarvis indicated frustrations at being placed in state custody but of her intentions to eventually return home. At this formal announcement, a statement from her family was read, thanking "the dedication" of all who had worked to identify Jarvis and to "provide [the] long-awaited, albeit painful answers" to their questions as to her whereabouts, adding that they take comfort from the fact she has been identified. This statement also thanked those who had visited her grave while she had remained unidentified and emphasized the family's wish for her murderer(s) to be brought to justice.

The investigation into Jarvis's murder is ongoing, and investigators have stated discovering Jarvis's identity has given them "some positive leads" of inquiry they are actively pursuing.

Other hypotheses

"Cathleen"
In December 2015, a photograph surfaced of a white female, aged approximately 14 years old and 5 feet 4 inches in height and whose other physical characteristics also closely matched those of Walker County Jane Doe. The girl depicted in the image is a possible runaway named "Cathleen" or "Kathleen" who may have hailed from Corpus Christi. This photograph emerged after a brother and sister reviewed a private collection of images taken of themselves—then aged 12 and 10—at a motel in Beeville, Texas in the summer of 1980. These siblings had encountered this girl at the motel in question and recall both that she may have lived with a couple at the time the image was taken, and that she had expressed her wishes to meet a friend from the Texas state prison in Sugar Land. Both of these siblings sincerely believed that Cathleen (or Kathleen) may have been Walker County Jane Doe.

A photograph of this girl, plus additional details of her physical characteristics and the circumstances surrounding the caption of this image, exist upon the Facebook page "Who Was Walker County Jane Doe? Sherri Ann Jarvis" This image and details pertaining to its caption are accompanied by appeals to the public to help provide the girl's full name and origins—all of which can be anonymously submitted to law enforcement should the sender wish to do so. Primarily, appeals were made to any individual who attended any elementary or middle school within Corpus Christi in the 1960s and/or 1970s who may recognize the girl in this photograph. Cathleen (or Kathleen) was most likely born in 1966, although her precise year of birth is unknown.

Gender of perpetrator
Some individuals have speculated Sherri Jarvis may have actually been assaulted and murdered by a female assailant as opposed to a male. This hypothesis was initially suggested by a journalist named Michael Hargraves, who based this assumption upon the fact that no semen was found upon or within Jarvis's body, or at the actual crime scene, and that the only sexual assaults conclusively proven to have been committed upon the girl were performed by aggressively forcing an object or objects into her bodily orifices. Hargraves elaborated his hypothesis by stating that men who commit crimes of a sexual nature are typically known to bite their victims upon sensitive areas of the body as opposed to the shoulder, as had occurred in this case.

The act of male perpetrators of murders committed with a sexual motivation occasionally collecting souvenirs from their victims was also noted to be inconsistent with this case, as the necklace Jarvis had worn was still present upon her body. However, the fact that it is unknown if Jarvis had worn other items of jewelry at the time of her murder, and that her ears were pierced yet her earlobes held no earrings may negate this portion of Hargraves' hypothesis. Furthermore, most of the girl's clothing was missing from the crime scene.

Links to other murders
A possibility exists that Jarvis may have been murdered by the same perpetrator as another formerly unidentified murder victim, known as "Orange Socks", who was murdered almost exactly a year before Jarvis and whose body was found in Georgetown, Texas. Serial killer Henry Lee Lucas has also been named as a possible suspect in this case, although the bite mark found upon Jarvis's shoulder was inconsistent with Lucas's dentistry. No prime suspects have been named in this murder, although police have considered the possibility that the victim was murdered by a serial killer.

In 2017, a theory arose that Jarvis may have been killed by the same perpetrator known to have murdered three other females in 1980 whose bodies were also discarded alongside Interstate 45. Only two of these four victims have been identified, and all had been strangled. All four victims have been described by investigators as being "high risk". One of these females, aged between 20 and 30, was located on October 15, 1980 in Houston. She was a black female with possible Asian heritage, and had died months prior to the discovery of her body. A second female was also black; her body was discovered beneath a bridge in Houston in December 1980. She was aged between 16 and 26 years old at the time of her murder.

Exclusions
The information compiled by the National Missing and Unidentified Persons System states the following individuals were each positively excluded as being Walker County Jane Doe prior to her 2021 identification.

See also

 Cold case
 Crime in Texas
 List of murdered American children
 List of solved missing person cases: pre-2000
 List of unsolved murders (1980–1999)
 National Center for Missing & Exploited Children
 The Doe Network
 Unidentified decedent

Notes

References

Cited works and further reading

External links
 Montgomery Police Department webpage pertaining to the Walker County Jane Doe
 Original forensic facial reconstruction of the Walker County Jane Doe at the official website of the National Center for Missing and Exploited Children
 Contemporary news article pertaining to the identity of Sherri Jarvis
 

1966 births
1980 deaths
1980 in Texas
1980 murders in the United States
1980s missing person cases
Deaths by person in Texas
Deaths by strangulation in the United States
Female murder victims
Incidents of violence against girls
Murdered American children
November 1980 events in the United States
People from Forest Lake, Minnesota
People from Stillwater, Minnesota
People murdered in Texas
Sexual assaults in the United States
Unsolved murders in the United States
Violence against women in the United States
Women in Minnesota